The 1996 Asian Acrobatic Gymnastics Championships were the third edition of the Asian Acrobatic Gymnastics Championships, and were held in Kawasaki, Japan, in December 1996.

Medal summary

References

A
Asian Gymnastics Championships
International gymnastics competitions hosted by Japan
1996 in Japanese sport